Heteracris is a genus of short-horned grasshoppers in the family Acrididae. There are more than 60 described species in Heteracris, found in Africa, southern Europe, and manland Asia through to India.

Species
These species belong to the genus Heteracris:

 Heteracris acuticercus Grunshaw, 1991
 Heteracris adspersa (Redtenbacher, 1889)
 Heteracris aethiopica (Ramme, 1929)
 Heteracris annulosa Walker, 1870
 Heteracris antennata (Bolívar, 1914)
 Heteracris attenuata (Uvarov, 1921)
 Heteracris brevipennis (Bolívar, 1914)
 Heteracris buxtoni (Uvarov, 1921)
 Heteracris calliptamoides Uvarov, 1921
 Heteracris caloptenoides (Bolívar, 1914)
 Heteracris coeruleipennis (Uvarov, 1921)
 Heteracris coerulescens (Stål, 1876)
 Heteracris coerulipes (Sjöstedt, 1910) (Eastern Arc Forest Grasshopper)
 Heteracris concinnicrus Descamps & Wintrebert, 1966
 Heteracris coniceps Walker, 1870
 Heteracris cyanescens (Uvarov, 1939)
 Heteracris drakensbergensis Grunshaw, 1991
 Heteracris etbaica Ramme, 1928
 Heteracris festae (Giglio-Tos, 1893)
 Heteracris finoti (Bolívar, 1914)
 Heteracris glabra (Uvarov, 1938)
 Heteracris guineensis (Krauss, 1890)
 Heteracris harterti (Bolívar, 1913)
 Heteracris hemiptera (Uvarov, 1935)
 Heteracris herbacea (Serville, 1838)
 Heteracris hoggarensis (Chopard, 1929)
 Heteracris iranica (Bey-Bienko, 1960)
 Heteracris jeanneli (Bolívar, 1914)
 Heteracris jucundus (Carl, 1916)
 Heteracris juliea Grunshaw, 1991
 Heteracris leani (Uvarov, 1941)
 Heteracris lieutaghii Defaut, 1986
 Heteracris littoralis (Rambur, 1838)
 Heteracris minuta (Uvarov, 1921)
 Heteracris morbosa (Serville, 1838)
 Heteracris muscatensis Popov, 1981
 Heteracris nefasitensis Grunshaw, 1991
 Heteracris nigricornis (Saussure, 1899)
 Heteracris nobilis (Brancsik, 1892)
 Heteracris notabilis (Uvarov, 1942)
 Heteracris persa (Uvarov, 1933)
 Heteracris pictipes (Bolívar, 1902)
 Heteracris popovi (Uvarov, 1952)
 Heteracris prasinata (Stål, 1876)
 Heteracris pterosticha (Fischer von Waldheim, 1833)
 Heteracris pulchra (Bolívar, 1902)
 Heteracris pulchripes (Schaum, 1853)
 Heteracris punctata (Uvarov, 1936)
 Heteracris puntica (Popov, 1981)
 Heteracris rantae (Uvarov, 1936)
 Heteracris reducta Dirsh, 1962
 Heteracris rufitibia Walker, 1871
 Heteracris sabaea Popov, 1981
 Heteracris sikorai (Bolívar, 1914)
 Heteracris somalica (Popov, 1981)
 Heteracris speciosa (Sjöstedt, 1913)
 Heteracris syriaca (Brunner von Wattenwyl, 1861)
 Heteracris theodori (Uvarov, 1929)
 Heteracris trimaculata Grunshaw, 1991 (Three-spotted Forest Grasshopper)
 Heteracris vinacea (Sjöstedt, 1923)
 Heteracris zolotarevskyi Dirsh, 1962
 Heteracris zulu Grunshaw, 1991

References

External links

 

Acrididae